Karate Combat is a brand which promotes the first professional, full-contact karate league, hosting worldwide events since April 2018. The private company is headquartered in New York and was founded by Michael DePietro and Robert Bryan. The business also encompasses sports equipment, a worldwide Dojo network and mobile apps for viewers. Karate Combat was founded in order to promote karate as a sport and martial art. Former UFC heavyweight champion Bas Rutten hosts Karate Combat venues alongside special guests.

Contestants compete in a seasonal championship in which the winner is awarded a golden belt. They consist of karateka from various styles of karate like Kyokushin, Shotokan, Shito Ryu, Wado Ryu, American Karate, Taekwondo and Tang Soo Do who are expected to abide by karate-do etiquette and specific tournament rules.

The organisation puts emphasis on innovation and technology with the use of video game-style analytics of fighter's biometrics, nutrition and DNA-based data in real-time. Fights regularly feature CGI environments created with the Unreal Engine as reported by NBC Sports. Marketing and promotion include appearances of Danny Trejo, Hafþór Júlíus Björnsson, former UFC two-division champion Georges St-Pierre, former UFC light heavyweight champion Lyoto Machida and UFC top-contender Stephen Thompson.

In 2020 rights to Karate Combat have been acquired by beIN SPORTS. The media group broadcasts the Karate Combat seasons in 37 countries.

Rules 

Fighting takes place in a 6,5m x 6,5m (21'4" x 21'4") square combat pit surrounded by 45° angled walls. A match consists of 3 rounds each lasting 3 minutes with the possibility of 2 additional rounds for championship fights.

Scoring uses a 10-point must system and is based on aggression and effectiveness of attacks. Three judges evaluate each fight from a position around the combat pit. Scoring cards are omitted in case of a knock-out.

Equipment consists of 4oz gloves, mouthpieces, groin protectors for male contestants, karate belts and officially designed long karate trousers with national emblems or flags.

Wrestling, submissions, elbows are not permitted. A grounded opponent may use upkicks while the standing opponent may use ground punches. After 5 seconds any grounded opponent will be brought back to a standing position by the referee.

Current championships

Divisions and Classification

Terminology 

Honoring the Japanese heritage of karate, combat techniques in Karate Combat are often referenced with original Japanese terminology.

Events 
Karate Combat events feature male and female karateka from a roster of over 100 professional fighters. The first five events were held in front of an invite-only audience. Later events incorporate CGI effects and original music in order to achieve a modern appearance and appeal to a younger demographic. Event locations favor optimal camera angles and cinematic scenery over a big live-audience. Thus locations like the 102nd floor of the One World Trade Center were chosen hosting a selected audience with black-tie dress code. The events attracted the notice of American television and newspaper. Recordings of all events can be accessed for free via the official website. Past events have also been streamed via UFC Fight Pass.

Season Overview

Season 1

Season 2

Season 3

Season 4

KC35

KC36

KC37

See also

Karate at the Summer Olympics
Karate World Championships

References

External links 
 

2018 establishments in New York City
BeIN Sports
Full contact karate
Karate competitions in the United States
Karate organizations
Kickboxing organizations
Sports leagues in the United States
Sports organizations established in 2018